Lufkin High School is a public high school located in Lufkin, Texas (United States) and is classified as a 5A school by the University Interscholastic League. It is part of the Lufkin Independent School District that serves the Lufkin area and central Angelina County.

History
Following the desegregation of Lufkin ISD in 1971, Lufkin High School and Dunbar High School, the formerly African-American School in Lufkin, consolidated. The current high school building was constructed and opened in 1999. In 2015, the school was rated "Met Standard" by the Texas Education Agency.

In 2018, a 75 million dollar bond was passed by Lufkin ISD, which included plans for a new sports complex to constructed at Lufkin High School. The complex officially opened in August 2021.

Academics
UIL Spelling and Vocabulary Champions
1999 (6A)
UIL Accounting Champions
2018 (5A)
2019 (5A)

Athletics
Lufkin High School student athletes compete as the Panthers in the following sports:
 Cross Country
 Volleyball
 Football
 Basketball
 Powerlifting
 Swimming
 Soccer
 Tennis
 Golf
 Track
 Softball
 Baseball

State titles
Lufkin (UIL)
Marching Band 
2021 (5A/6A)
Baseball
1963 (4A)
Boys Basketball
1979 (4A)
Football 
2001 (5A)
Boys Soccer 
2015 (6A)

Lufkin Dunbar (PVIL)

Football
1964 (PVIL-6A), 1966 (PVIL-6A), 1967 (PVIL-6A)

Fine arts
The Lufkin High School Panther Band received the only superior rating of (1,1,1) at all UIL Marching Competitions 2008 through 2020. The band also won the Military state marching title in 2016, 2017 (6A) and 2019 (5A) at the NAMMB Military State Marching Contest. As well, the band has sent numerous students to the TMEA All State clinic.

The Lufkin High School choir received a 1 at competition for 2008–2009, and every year for the past eight years.
The Lufkin High School choir has also been participating in competitions and ensembles.

The Lufkin High School theater department also advanced to area competition in 2013, and district competition in 2014.

Notable alumni 

 Bruce Alexander – former NFL player
 Dez Bryant – former Oklahoma State University football player; former Dallas Cowboys Wide Receiver, current Baltimore Ravens wide receiver 
 Carrington Byndom – former Carolina Panthers cornerback
 Keke Coutee - former Texas Tech University football player; current Houston Texans wide receiver
 Rex Hadnot –  former University of Houston Offensive Guard; former San Diego Chargers Offensive Guard. Former placer for the Arizona Cardinals (2010–2011), Cleveland Browns (2008–2009) and Miami Dolphins (2004–2007)
 Terrence Kiel, former Texas A&M University and San Diego Chargers safety
 Jorvorskie Lane – former Texas A&M University football player; former Miami Dolphins Fullback; former Tampa Bay Buccaneers fullback; holds Texas state high school record for career rushing touchdowns (49)
 Reggie McNeal – former Texas A&M University quarterback; former Cincinnati Bengals wide receiver; former Canadian Football League wide receiver and quarterback
 Don Muhlbach – former Texas A&M University football player; current Detroit Lions deep snapper
 Pete Runnels – former infielder for the Houston Colt .45's (1963–1964), Boston Red Sox (1958–1962) and Washington Senators (1951–1957)
 Joe Robb – former Texas Christian University Offensive Lineman. Played for the Detroit Lions (1968–1971), St. Louis Cardinals (1961–1967) and Philadelphia Eagles (1959–1960)
 Ryan Rottman – actor
 Ken Houston – Lufkin Dunbar graduate who played for the Washington Redskins (1973–1980) and Houston Oilers (1967–1972); was inducted into the Pro Football Hall of Fame in 1986
 Jacoby Shepherd – former NFL cornerback
 Suzy Spencer - journalist and New York Times bestselling author; class of 1972
 Joe Williams – former NFL player, graduated from Dunbar High School
  Erik McCoy - Current starting center of the New Orleans Saints

References

No

External links

 Lufkin ISD Homepage
 Lufkin High School Alumni Association

Schools in Angelina County, Texas
Public high schools in Texas
Lufkin, Texas
1970 establishments in Texas